The Dictator may refer to:
 The Dictator (1915 film), a silent film comedy directed by Oscar Eagle
 The Dictator (1922 film), a silent film comedy directed by James Cruze
 The Dictator (1935 film), a British historical drama film directed by Victor Saville
 The Dictator (2012 film), a 2012 comedy film starring Sacha Baron Cohen
The Dictator, a play by Richard Harding Davis
 Dictator (2016 film), a 2016 Indian Telugu-language action film
 The Dictators, an American proto-punk and punk rock band

See also 
 Dictator (disambiguation)
 The Great Dictator, a 1940 film starring Charlie Chaplin